Washington Heights is an unincorporated community on the Spruce Fork in Boone County in the U.S. state of West Virginia. Washington Heights lies to the south of Madison on West Virginia Route 17.

Unincorporated communities in Boone County, West Virginia
Unincorporated communities in West Virginia
Charleston, West Virginia metropolitan area